Bianca (minor planet designation: 218 Bianca) is a sizeable Main belt asteroid. It is an S-type asteroid. It was discovered by Johann Palisa on 4 September 1880, in Pola and was named after the Austro-Hungarian opera singer Bianca Bianchi (real name Bertha Schwarz). The Vienna newspapers contained several published accounts of the circumstances surrounding the honor extended to the diva in Spring 1882. In the late 1990s, a network of astronomers worldwide gathered lightcurve data that was ultimately used to derive the spin states and shape models of ten new asteroids, including (218) Bianca. The shape model for this asteroid is asymmetrical.

References

External links 
 Asteroid Lightcurve Data File
 
 

Background asteroids
Bianca
Bianca
S-type asteroids (Tholen)
18800904